Jean-Christophe Matahuira Bouissou (born 28 October 1960) is a French Polynesian politician and leader of the Rautahi political party.

Education and early career 
He received his degree in information and mathematics from Graceland University in 1984. His political career began shortly afterward and in 1998 he became Minister of Housing. He went on to become a Labour minister in 2000.

Crises and aftermaths 
From 26 October 2004 to 16 February 2005 he was spokesman of the Flosse government, right after the fall of Oscar Temaru’s government due to a motion of censure on 9 October 2004. At that time he also served as Interior Minister and the period has been referred to as one of turmoil. In September 2005 he launched a new pro-autonomy party, the Rautahi party. Although he had been in Flosse's government, by 2010 the two expressed criticisms of each other and had become political rivals.

In October 2007 he was fined for corruption, after favouring his half-brother in social-housing allocation in 2002 while housing minister. In 2013 he was charged with corruption again over his links to New Caledonian businessman Bill Ravel.

In September 2014 he joined the government of Edouard Fritch.

In November 2021 he was appointed vice-president, replacing Tearii Alpha.

References 

1960 births
Living people
French Polynesian politicians
Graceland University alumni
Aia Api politicians
French Polynesian members of the Community of Christ
Government ministers of French Polynesia
Housing ministers of French Polynesia
Labour ministers of French Polynesia